The 2021 US Open described in detail, in the form of day-by-day summaries.

Day 1 (August 30) 
 Seeds out:
 Men's Singles:  John Isner [19],  Ugo Humbert [23],  Cameron Norrie [26],  Alejandro Davidovich Fokina [29],  Marin Čilić [30],  Filip Krajinović [32]
 Women's Singles:  Yulia Putintseva [31]
 Schedule of Play

Day 2 (August 31) 
 Seeds out:
 Men's Singles:  Pablo Carreño Busta [9],  Alex de Minaur [14],  Lorenzo Sonego [20],  Karen Khachanov [25],  David Goffin [27],  Fabio Fognini [28] 
 Women's Singles:  Karolína Muchová [22],  Veronika Kudermetova [29]
 Schedule of Play

Day 3 (September 1) 
Half of the matches were played as scheduled, with the remaining matches on outer courts and Louis Armstrong Stadium postponed due to heavy rain caused by the remnants of Hurricane Ida.

 Seeds out:
 Men's Singles:  Casper Ruud [8],  Grigor Dimitrov [15],  Cristian Garín [16]
 Women's Singles:  Coco Gauff [21],  Ekaterina Alexandrova [32]
 Schedule of Play

Day 4 (September 2) 
Due to heavy rain associated with Hurricane Ida from the previous night, play was delayed one hour and began at 12:00 pm EDT.
 Seeds out:
 Men's Singles:  Hubert Hurkacz [10],  Alexander Bublik [31]
 Women's Singles:  Paula Badosa [24],  Petra Martić [30]
 Men's Doubles:  Nikola Mektić /  Mate Pavić [1],  Juan Sebastián Cabal /  Robert Farah [5],  Łukasz Kubot /  Marcelo Melo [9],  Tim Pütz /  Michael Venus [12]
 Women's Doubles:  Barbora Krejčíková /  Kateřina Siniaková [2],  Nicole Melichar-Martinez /  Demi Schuurs [4],  Asia Muhammad /  Jessica Pegula [13]
 Mixed Doubles:  Luisa Stefani /  Marcelo Melo [4]
 Schedule of Play

Day 5 (September 3) 
 Seeds out:
 Men's Singles:  Stefanos Tsitsipas [3],  Andrey Rublev [5],  Roberto Bautista Agut [18]
 Women's Singles:  Naomi Osaka [3],  Victoria Azarenka [18],  Elena Rybakina [19],  Ons Jabeur [20],  Daria Kasatkina [25],  Danielle Collins [26]
 Women's Doubles:  Ellen Perez /  Květa Peschke [16],  Aleksandra Krunić /  Nina Stojanović [17]
 Mixed Doubles:  Bethanie Mattek-Sands /  Jamie Murray [5],  Chan Hao-ching /  Michael Venus [7]
 Schedule of Play

Day 6 (September 4) 
 Seeds out:
 Men's Singles:  Denis Shapovalov [7],  Gaël Monfils [17],  Aslan Karatsev [21]
 Women's Singles:  Ashleigh Barty [1],  Petra Kvitová [10],  Jessica Pegula [23],  Anett Kontaveit [28]
 Men's Doubles:  Raven Klaasen /  Ben McLachlan [11],  Simone Bolelli /  Máximo González [14],  Sander Gillé /  Joran Vliegen [16]
 Mixed Doubles:  Nicole Melichar-Martinez /  Ivan Dodig [1]
 Schedule of Play

Day 7 (September 5) 
 Seeds out:
 Men's Singles:  Diego Schwartzman [11],  Dan Evans [24]
 Women's Singles:  Garbiñe Muguruza [9],  Simona Halep [12],  Elise Mertens [15],  Angelique Kerber [16]
 Women's Doubles:  Veronika Kudermetova /  Bethanie Mattek-Sands [6]
 Mixed Doubles:  Ena Shibahara /  Ben McLachlan [6]
 Schedule of Play

Day 8 (September 6) 
 Seeds out:
 Men's Singles:  Jannik Sinner [13],  Reilly Opelka [22]
 Women's Singles:  Bianca Andreescu [6],  Iga Świątek [7],  Anastasia Pavlyuchenkova [14]
 Men's Doubles:  Wesley Koolhof /  Jean-Julien Rojer [10],  Rohan Bopanna /  Ivan Dodig [13],  Andrey Golubev /  Andreas Mies [15]
 Women's Doubles:  Ena Shibahara /  Shuko Aoyama [3],  Darija Jurak /  Andreja Klepač [8],  Nadiia Kichenok /  Raluca Olaru [12]
 Schedule of Play

Day 9 (September 7) 
 Seeds out:
 Women's Singles:  Elina Svitolina [5],  Barbora Krejčíková [8] 
 Men's Doubles:  Marcel Granollers /  Horacio Zeballos [2],  Pierre-Hugues Herbert /  Nicolas Mahut [3],  Kevin Krawietz /  Horia Tecău [6]
 Women's Doubles:  Caroline Dolehide /  Storm Sanders [10]
 Mixed Doubles:  Alexa Guarachi /  Neal Skupski [3],  Demi Schuurs /  Sander Gillé [8]
 Schedule of Play

Day 10 (September 8) 
 Seeds out:
 Men's Singles:  Matteo Berrettini [6]
 Women's Singles:  Karolína Plíšková [4],  Belinda Bencic [11]
 Women's Doubles:  Hsieh Su-wei /  Elise Mertens [1],  Marie Bouzková /  Lucie Hradecká [15]
 Schedule of Play

Day 11 (September 9) 
 Seeds out:
 Women's Singles:  Aryna Sabalenka [2],  Maria Sakkari [17]
 Men's Doubles:  John Peers /  Filip Polášek [8]
 Schedule of Play

Day 12 (September 10) 
 Seeds out:
 Men's Singles:  Alexander Zverev [4],  Félix Auger-Aliassime [12]
 Men's Doubles:  Jamie Murray /  Bruno Soares [7]
 Women's Doubles:  Gabriela Dabrowski /  Luisa Stefani [5],  Alexa Guarachi /  Desirae Krawczyk [7]
 Schedule of Play

Day 13 (September 11) 
 Schedule of Play

Day 14 (September 12) 
 Seeds out:
 Men's Singles:  Novak Djokovic [1]
 Women's Doubles:  Coco Gauff /  Caty McNally [11]
 Schedule of Play

References

Day-by-day summaries
US Open (tennis) by year – Day-by-day summaries